Nation Radio Wales is a regional radio station, broadcasting to south and west Wales on FM and across Wales on DAB. It is owned and operated by Nation Broadcasting and broadcasts from studios near the St Hilary transmitter on the outskirts of Cowbridge.

The station's music playlist originally consisted of new and classic guitar-led music, reflecting the franchise won originally by XFM, but in 2015, the format was changed to a broader format including mainstream pop music.

As of December 2022, the station broadcasts to a weekly audience of 173,000, according to RAJAR.

History
Nation Radio began broadcasting on 16 June 2008, taking over the regional Ofcom broadcasting licence, which was held by XFM South Wales until GCap Media sold the station to Town and Country (now Nation Broadcasting) on 30 May 2008.

In 2013, Nation Radio increased its coverage area via DAB - it began broadcasting to north-east Wales and parts of Cheshire and Merseyside in March, via MuxCo's Wrexham, Chester and Liverpool multiplex. In August, the station launched in Pembrokeshire and Carmarthenshire via the Muxco Mid and West Wales multiplex.

In December 2017, Nation began broadcasting on FM in Carmarthenshire (102.9 FM) and Pembrokeshire (107.1 FM) Since March 2018, the station has broadcast in stereo on DAB+ in North East Wales.

In December 2018, OFCOM gave the station's owners permission to replace sister station Radio Ceredigion with a relay of Nation. Five months later, it was reported Nation had decided to retain the local service and would request to reverse its decision on the station's format. In May 2019, Nation Broadcasting withdrew its request and Radio Ceredigion was replaced by a relay of Nation Radio Wales as originally planned.

Programming
Most of Nation Radio's programming is produced and broadcast from its St Hilary studios.

Some off-peak programming - including the Russ Williams afternoon show and Fox's Jukebox on weekday evenings - is shared with other Nation-owned stations, including Nation Radio Scotland.

News
Local news bulletins air hourly from 6am - 7pm on weekdays and 7am - 1pm at weekends with headlines on the half-hour during weekday breakfast and drivetime.

National news bulletins from Sky News Radio air hourly at other times.

Frequencies 
Nation Radio's main transmitter is at the well-positioned Wenvoe site near Cardiff, broadcasting on 106.80 MHz, serving Cardiff, Newport, the Vale of Glamorgan, Bridgend, Neath Port Talbot, Rhondda Cynon Taf, South Wales Valleys, Monmouthshire, the Brecon Beacons and the Gower A.O.N.B. Unofficially, the 106.80 MHz frequency from Wenvoe also serves Bristol, Gloucestershire and parts of Somerset, Wiltshire and Herefordshire.

Kilvey Hill serves the Swansea area on 107.30 MHz albeit with a very small coverage area, Carmel serves Carmarthenshire on 102.9 MHz, Preseli serves Pembrokeshire on 107.1 MHz and Blaenplwyf serves Cardigan on 103.30 MHz.

References

An application for the Ceredigion FM licence from Radio Ceredigion Ltd
Reference Offer for the provision of Transmission Services in respect of Re-advertisement of FM local commercial radio licence for Ceredigion

External links

Radio stations in Cardiff
Radio stations established in 2007
Nation Broadcasting